Colin Payne (born 17 November 1945) is a Barbadian cricketer. He played in two first-class matches for the Barbados cricket team in 1971/72 and 1972/73.

See also
 List of Barbadian representative cricketers

References

External links
 

1945 births
Living people
Barbadian cricketers
Barbados cricketers
People from Saint Michael, Barbados